Guess My Story was a Canadian television series which aired on CBC Television in 1954.

Premise
This Toronto-produced quiz show involved four guests, one of which had been involved in an event in the recent news.   Three panelists had to ask questions to identify the news story and which of the guests had been involved.  The same format was later used to produce the show Front Page Challenge.

Scheduling
This half-hour series aired Fridays at 8:00 p.m. (Eastern) from 2 July to 6 August 1954.

References

External links
 

CBC Television original programming
1954 Canadian television series debuts
1954 Canadian television series endings
1950s Canadian game shows
Black-and-white Canadian television shows
Television shows filmed in Toronto
Panel games